Beth Quist, a multi-instrumentalist, vocalist, and composer, began playing piano at age 2. She has a 4-octave soprano voice, and plays piano, keyboards, santour (hammered dulcimer), dumbek, guitar, flute, and various other instruments.

Her music combines influences from the Balkans, the Middle East, and India along with her Western upbringing.

Based in USA, she performs solo, with Bobby McFerrin's Voicestra, and with Ishwish. She recently finished a 2+ year contract with Cirque du Soleil.  In years past she has made guest appearances with Kitaro, the Geoffrey Castle Band (formerly known as Guarneri Underground), and Children of the Revolution. She also composes scores for dance, film and other media. She is signed to the label Magnatune.

References

External links
 Beth Quist on Magnatune
 Beth Quist homepage
 Ishwish

Magnatune artists
Living people
Year of birth missing (living people)